Keep Running, previously known as Running Man China, is a Chinese variety show, broadcast on ZRTG: Zhejiang Television. This show is classified as a game-variety show, where the MCs and guests complete missions in a landmark to win a race which would provide hints/items to later help them. The show first aired on October 10, 2014.

, 107 episodes of Running Man China have been aired. There are also 2 special episodes and a movie.

Series overview

Episodes
If more than one set of teams are used other than the Race Mission teams, they are divided and distinguished to the corresponding mission under Teams. Team members are listed in alphabetical order from Team Leader to Members, to Guests. As some episodes consisted of road missions and were not confined to a single landmark nor was a landmark officially recognized on-air, the landmark shown for those episodes is the final mission venue.

Season 1 
 (episodes 1-15)

Season 2 
 (episodes 16-27)

Season 3 
 (episodes 28-39)

Season 4 
 (episodes 40-51)

Season 5 
 (episodes 52-63)

Season 6 
 (episodes 64-75)

Season 7 
 (episodes 76-87)

Season 8 
 (episodes 88-101)

Special Season: Yellow River 
 (episodes 102-107)

Season 9 
 (episodes 108-119)

Special episodes

Season 10 
 (episodes 120-132)

Movie

References

External links
Running Man China Official Homepage

Keep Running